Daniel French (born 25 November 1979) is an English footballer who played in The Football League for Peterborough United.

References

English footballers
Boston United F.C. players
Peterborough United F.C. players
English Football League players
1979 births
Living people
Cambridge City F.C. players
Association football midfielders